Porcellionides floria is a species of woodlouse in the family Porcellionidae. It is found in North America and Mexico.

References

Porcellionidae
Articles created by Qbugbot
Crustaceans described in 1985